The year 1976 was the 5th year after the independence of Bangladesh. It was also the year when Gen Ziaur Rahman consolidated his power and proceeded to become the President.

Incumbents
 President: Abu Sadat Mohammad Sayem
 Chief Justice: Syed A. B. Mahmud Hossain

Demography

Climate

Economy

Note: For the year 1976 average official exchange rate for BDT was 15.40 per US$.

Events

 16 May - Farakka Long March was led by Maulana Abdul Hamid Khan Bhashani, demanded demolition of the Farakka Barrage constructed by India to divert flow of Ganges waters inside its territory, triggering the drying up of river Padma and desertification of Bangladesh.
 21 July - Col. Abu Taher was tried by a military tribunal inside the Dhaka Central Jail and sentenced to death. The trial was later considered flawed.
 Five years after the secession of East Pakistan, Pakistan has Diplomatic Relations with Bangladesh.
 19 November - General Zia took over the powers of Chief Martial Law Administrator, leaving President Sayem with only ceremonial function.

Awards and recognitions

In the year 1976, the first year of the award, 9 individuals were awarded Ekushey Padak in recognition of their contribution to different fields:
 Kazi Nazrul Islam (Literature)
 Muhammad Qudrat-i-Khuda (Education)
 Jasimuddin (literature)
 Sufia Kamal (literature)
 Abdul Quadir (literature)
 Muhammed Mansooruddin (education)
 Tofazzal Hossain Manik Miah (journalism)
 Abul Kalam Shamsuddin (literature)
 Abdus Salam (Editor) (journalism)

Sports
 Domestic football: Mohammedan SC won Dhaka League title, while Abahani KC came out runners-up.
 Marylebone Cricket Club visited Bangladesh

Births
 Amitabh Reza Chowdhury, filmmaker
 Sadia Islam Mou, model and actor

Deaths

 13 March: Poet Jasim Uddin (b. 1903)
 28 May: Zainul Abedin, painter (b. 1914)
 21 July: Col. Abu Taher, Bir Uttom. (b. 1938)
 29 August: Kazi Nazrul Islam, the national poet. (b. 1899)
 17 November: Abdul Hamid Khan Bhashani, politician (b. 1880)
 21 November: Ava Alam, classical singer (b. 1947)

See also 
 1970s in Bangladesh
 List of Bangladeshi films of 1976
 Timeline of Bangladeshi history

References